Electoral history of John Adams, who served as the second president of the United States (1797–1801) and the first vice president of the United States (1789–1797). Prior to being president, he had diplomatic experience as the second United States envoy to France (1777–1779), the first United States minister to the Netherlands (1782–1788), and the first United States minister to the United Kingdom (1785–1788). After losing the 1800 presidential election to Thomas Jefferson, he would mostly retire from political life, with his second youngest son, John Quincy Adams (1767–1848), being elected as the sixth President of the United States (1825–1829) in the 1824 presidential election against Tennessee Senator Andrew Jackson.

1788–89 United States presidential election 
The first U.S. presidential election was held over a period of weeks from December 1788 to January 1789. Adams was elected with 34 of the 69 first-round votes cast in the United States Electoral College. Since Adams got the second most electoral votes, he was elected to serve as the first vice-president of the United States under President George Washington

No popular vote totals are listed in this table. In early elections, many electors were chosen by state legislatures instead of public balloting, and votes were cast for undifferentiated lists of candidates in those states which practiced public balloting, leaving no or only partial vote totals.

1792 United States presidential election 

Adams would be re-elected to the vice-presidency in 1792, with Adams was elected with 77 of the 132 first-round votes cast in the United States Electoral College.

1796 United States presidential election 

The 1796 presidential election was the third presidential election in U.S History and was the first one to be contested between two separate parties, the Democratic-Republicans who nominated former Secretary of State Thomas Jefferson for the presidency, and the Federalist Party who had nominated Adams. Adams had selected former Governor of South Carolina, Thomas Pinckney, as his vice-presidential running mate in the Federalist Party ticket, while Jefferson nominated New York Senator Aaron Burr as his vice presidential running mate in the Democratic-Republican ticket.

Adams beat Jefferson in the 1796 election, with Adams being elected with 71 of the 138 first-round votes cast in the United States Electoral College. Jefferson, however, would come in second place being elected vice-president with 68 of the 138 first-round votes cast in the United States Electoral College, defeating Adams' VP nominee Thomas Pinckney who got 55 of the 138 first-round votes cast in the United States Electoral College. This would also be the only election in U.S History where the Federalist candidate won the election.

1800 United States presidential election 

The 1800 presidential election was a rematch between incumbent President Adams and incumbent Vice-president Jefferson. It is the only election in U.S History between an incumbent president and an incumbent vice-president.

Adams had selected former United States Minister to France Charles C. Pinckney (1746–1825), as his vice-presidential running mate in the Federalist Party ticket, while Jefferson nominated former New York Senator Aaron Burr (1756–1836) as his vice-presidential running mate in the Democratic-Republican ticket.

Jefferson would win 73 of the 138 first-round votes cast in the United States Electoral College, while Adams won 65 of the 138 first-round votes cast in the United States Electoral College making Jefferson the third president of the United States (1801–1809), and Burr the third vice-president of the United States (1801–1805). It also made Jefferson the second consecutive president to have previously served as VP and Adams the first U.S. president to only serve one term.

 Only 6 of the 10 states casting electoral votes chose electors by any form of the popular vote.

 Less than 1.8% of the population voted: the 1790 Census would count a total population of 3.0 million with a free population of 2.4 million and 600,000 slaves in those states casting electoral votes.

 Those states that did choose electors by popular vote had widely varying restrictions on suffrage via property requirements.

 As the New York legislature failed to appoint its allotted eight electors in time, there were no voting electors from New York.

 Two electors from Maryland did not vote.

 One elector from Virginia did not vote and another elector from Virginia was not chosen because an election district failed to submit returns.

 The identity of this candidate comes from The Documentary History of the First Federal Elections (Gordon DenBoer (ed.), University of Wisconsin Press, 1984, p. 441). Several respected sources, including the Biographical Directory of the United States Congress and the Political Graveyard, instead show this individual to be James Armstrong of Pennsylvania. However, primary sources, such as the Senate Journal, list only Armstrong's name, not his state. Skeptics observe that Armstrong received his single vote from a Georgia elector. They find this improbable because Armstrong of Pennsylvania was not nationally famous—his public service to that date consisted of being a medical officer during the American Revolution and, at most, a single year as a Pennsylvania judge.

Source:  Source (popular vote): A New Nation Votes: American Election Returns 1787–1825

References 

John Adams
Adams, John